Francis William Thompson (2 October 1885 – 4 October 1950) was an Irish international football player and manager who played professionally in Ireland, England and Scotland.

Career
While playing with Cliftonville, Thompson won the Irish League once and the Irish Cup twice. He then played briefly with Black Diamonds and Linfield before moving to England to play with Bradford City in December 1910. In his three years with the Bantams, he won the 1911 FA Cup Final and earned seven international caps for Ireland. (he collected twelve in total between 1910 and 1914). He then moved to Scotland with Clyde, eventually becoming their player-manager, and also spent time as manager of Ayr United, before returning to Ireland to become manager of Glentoran.

His 1911 FA Cup Final winners medal sold for £19,000 at a London auction for sporting memorabilia in 2003.

Honours

Player 
Clyde
Glasgow Cup: 1914–15

References

1885 births
1950 deaths
Irish association footballers (before 1923)
Football managers from Northern Ireland
Pre-1950 IFA international footballers
Cliftonville F.C. players
Linfield F.C. players
Bradford City A.F.C. players
Clyde F.C. players
Clyde F.C. managers
Ayr United F.C. managers
Glentoran F.C. managers
People from Ballynahinch, County Down
NIFL Premiership players
Scottish Football League players
Scottish Football League managers
Association football outside forwards
FA Cup Final players
English Football League players